Twice: Seize the Light (stylized as TWICE: Seize the Light) is a 2020 South Korean documentary show starring Nayeon, Jeongyeon, Momo, Sana, Jihyo, Mina, Dahyun, Chaeyoung, and Tzuyu, directed by Heejin Jeong and Jungho Li, the documentary is about the experience of the South Korean girl group Twice on their first successful world tour "Twicelights" in 2019.

Twice: Seize the Light was released worldwide on YouTube Originals on April 29, 2020.

Synopsis 
The all-access documentary covers the struggle they have experienced on their first world tour in 2019, with their stress backstage during the "Twicelights" tour and overcoming those struggles through trust and reliance on each other, as well as their journey as trainees up to their first world tour.

Cast 

 Nayeon
 Jeongyeon
 Momo
 Sana
 Jihyo
 Mina
 Dahyun
 Chaeyoung
 Tzuyu
 Park Jin-young

Production 
In August 2019, Billboard revealed that YouTube and JYP Entertainment have cooperated and partnered to create a YouTube docu-series. This is the first documentary series that Twice made. Before the release of Twice: Seize the Light episode 1, Jihyo announced the release date of their ninth EP, More & More.

Promotion 
On April 13, 2020, the official teaser was released on their YouTube channel and announced the premiere of their docu-series on their social media accounts.

Reception 
The series was reviewed by Yae-rim Kwon of The Korea Herald, who said that they enjoyed the episodes but wished that they had gone into more depth. Nadie Esteban of Cosmopolitan also commented on the series, stating that it was "a great opportunity for fans to become closer to Twice in a very personal way."

References

External links 

 

YouTube Premium original series
Twice (group)
Documentaries about music